The Cup of Fury may refer to:

 The Cup of Fury (book), a 1956 non-fiction work  by Upton Sinclair
 The Cup of Fury (film), a 1920 American silent drama film